The 2014–15 Michigan State Spartans women's basketball team will represent Michigan State University during the 2014–15 NCAA Division I women's basketball season. The Spartans, led by eighth year head coach Suzy Merchant, play their home games at the Breslin Center and were members of the Big Ten Conference. They finished the season 16–15, 7–11 in Big Ten play to finish in ninth place. They advanced to the quarterfinals of the Big Ten women's tournament which they lost to Maryland. They did not participate in a postseason tournament for the first time since 2001.

Roster

Schedule

|-
!colspan=9 style="background:#18453b; color:#FFFFFF;"| Exhibition

|-
!colspan=9 style="background:#18453b; color:#FFFFFF;"| Non-conference regular season

|-
!colspan=9 style="background:#18453b; color:#FFFFFF;"| Big Ten regular season

|-
!colspan=9 style="text-align: center; background:#18453b"|Big Ten Women's Tournament

Rankings

See also
2014–15 Michigan State Spartans men's basketball team

References

Michigan State Spartans women's basketball seasons
Michigan State